Engine Down was an American rock band from Richmond, Virginia, active from 1996 to 2005. They were a part of the Washington, D.C. area post-hardcore movement, along with bands like The Dismemberment Plan, Q and Not U, and Faraquet. The lineup included Keeley Davis on guitar and vocals, Jason Wood on bass and vocals, Jonathan Fuller on guitar and backup vocals, and Cornbread Compton on drums. In early recordings, Wood and founding member Jeremy Taylor served as primary lead vocalists, but later in their career the duties of lead singer switched primarily to Davis.

In 2005 Engine Down disbanded, following a farewell tour.  Davis joined the band Sparta as lead guitarist. Compton began drumming for various bands including Biology, a side project with From Autumn to Ashes members Francis Mark and Josh Newton. Compton then joined Cursive to record their 2009 album Mama, I'm Swollen. Keeley and Jonathan Fuller have reunited in both Denali, and new band, Heks Orkest, featuring Denali member, Cam DiNunzio.

Members
Keeley Davis – guitar, vocals
Jason Wood – bass, vocals
Jonathan Fuller – guitar, vocals
Cornbread Compton – drums, percussion, piano
Jeremy Taylor – guitar, vocals (1996–98)

Discography
Studio albums
Under the Pretense of Present Tense (1999)
To Bury Within the Sound (2000)
Demure (2002) - 7.5/10 on Pitchfork, D+ on Stylus
Engine Down (2004) - 7.7/10 on Pitchfork

EPs and singles
"2 Song" - 7" (1998)
"Twelve Hour Turn/Engine Down" - Split 7" (1998)
Sign of Breath EP/7" (2001)

DVDs
From Beginning to End (2008)

References

External links
Official band site
Engine Down on MySpace
MusicIsMyDrug.com page

Interviews
 It's All About the Music interview November 2002

Alternative rock groups from Virginia
American post-hardcore musical groups
American emo musical groups
Indie rock musical groups from Virginia
Math rock groups
Music of Richmond, Virginia
Musical groups established in 1996
Musical groups disestablished in 2005